Mount Herbert / Te Ahu Pātiki is, at , the highest peak on Banks Peninsula, New Zealand. It is south of Lyttelton Harbour with the township of Diamond Harbour at its northern foot.

The peak is named after  Sidney Herbert, a member of the Canterbury Association. The official name of the peak was amended to become a dual name by the Ngāi Tahu Claims Settlement Act 1998.

References

Herbert
Banks Peninsula